Hortonella is a fossil genus of alga that has been placed deep in the coralline stem group on the basis of its scarcely differentiated thallus.

References

Fossil algae
Carboniferous life